Lay It on the Line may refer to:

Music
 Lay It on the Line (band), formed 2012

Albums

 Lay It on the Line, 1986 album by The Wailing Souls 
 Lay It on the Line, 1988 album by Sam Riney featuring David Benoit as a sideman

Songs

 "Lay It on the Line", 1957 song by Johnny Bond
 "Lay It on the Line", 1969 song by Buddy Hampton, written by Ray Griff
 "Lay It on the Line", 1969 song by Jimmy Hughes, written by Charles Chalmers	
 "Lay It on the Line", 1970 song by Teddy Hill, written Richard Law 
 "Lay It on the Line", song by The Partridge Family from the 1971 album Up to Date
 "Lay It on the Line", 1974 single by The Crusaders, written by Stix Hooper
 "Lay It on the Line", 1977 song by Pal Rakes 
 "Lay It on the Line", 1978 song by Michael Robinson, written by David McWilliams
 "Lay It on the Line", song by The Pointer Sisters from the 1978 album Energy
 "Lay It on the Line", song by Triumph from the 1979 album Just a Game
 "Lay It on the Line", song by Grim Reaper from the 1985 album Fear No Evil
 "Lay It on the Line", song by Elaine Charles from the 1989 album Disco de Oro Vol. 2
 "Lay It on the Line", song by Giant from the 1992 album Time to Burn
 "Lay It on the Line", song by 4Him from their 1999 greatest hits album Best Ones
 "Lay It on the Line", single by Canadian R&B singer Divine Brown from the 2008 album The Love Chronicles
 "Lay It on the Line", song by Matt Andersen from the 2011 album Coal Mining Blues
 "Lay It on the Line", 2011 song by Nick Pride and the Pimptones